Kuzman Babeu (born 4 November 1971) is a Serbian former professional footballer who played as a defender and current manager.

Career
Regarded as a physical player, Babeu is best remembered for his time at Obilić, between 1996 and 2000, during Arkan's ownership of the club. He was one of the most regular members of the team that controversially won the 1997–98 First League of FR Yugoslavia. In the summer of 2000, Babeu was close to signing with Red Star Belgrade. However, according to Babeu, the club's president, Dragan Džajić, eventually decided to pull out of the deal due to Babeu's mature age. After leaving Obilić, Babeu briefly played for Slavia Sofia (2000), Sutjeska Nikšić (2001), Remont Čačak (2001), Mladost Apatin (2002), Palilulac Beograd (2003), Henan Construction (2004), and Hajduk Beograd (2005).

After hanging up his boots, Babeu served as manager of several lower league clubs, including Serbian League Belgrade's Balkan Mirijevo and Drina Zone League's Polimlje.

Honours
Obilić
 First League of FR Yugoslavia: 1997–98
 FR Yugoslavia Cup: Runner-up 1997–98

References

External links
 
 

Association football defenders
China League One players
Expatriate footballers in Bulgaria
Expatriate footballers in China
First League of Serbia and Montenegro players
First Professional Football League (Bulgaria) players
FK Beograd players
FK Dinamo Pančevo players
FK Hajduk Beograd players
FK Mladost Apatin players
FK Obilić players
FK Palilulac Beograd players
FK Remont Čačak players
FK Sutjeska Nikšić players
Footballers from Belgrade
Henan Songshan Longmen F.C. players
PFC Slavia Sofia players
Serbia and Montenegro expatriate footballers
Serbia and Montenegro expatriates in Bulgaria
Serbia and Montenegro expatriates in China
Serbia and Montenegro footballers
Serbian football managers
Serbian footballers
Yugoslav footballers
1971 births
Living people